Light Regional Council is a local government area north of Adelaide in South Australia. It is based in the town of Kapunda, and includes the towns of Freeling, Greenock, Hansborough, Hewett, Roseworthy and Wasleys.

The council is named for the River Light, the south bank of which forms much of the council area's northwest border. The river is named after William Light, the first Surveyor-General of South Australia.

History
The council came into existence on 1 March 1996 as the District Council of Light and Kapunda by the amalgamation of the District Council of Light and the District Council of Kapunda. The council changed to the current name of Light Regional Council on 1 July 2000.

Geography

The council includes the localities of Allendale North, Bagot Well, Bethel, Daveyston, Ebenezer, Fords, Freeling, Gawler Belt, Gawler River, Gomersal, Greenock, Hamilton, Hewett, Kangaroo Flat, Kapunda, Kingsford, Koonunga, Linwood, Magdala, Marananga, Moppa, Morn Hill, Nain, Pinkerton Plains, Roseworthy, Seppeltsfield, Shea-Oak Log, St Johns, St Kitts, Stone Well, Tanunda, Templers, Ward Belt, Wasleys and Woolsheds, and parts of Hamley Bridge, Hansborough, Lyndoch, Nuriootpa, Reeves Plains, Rosedale, Rowland Flat, Stockwell and Truro.

Transport
The council district is crossed by the Horrocks Highway, Thiele Highway and Sturt Highway, all radiating from the northern end of the Gawler Bypass Road which forms the boundary between Light Regional Council and the Town of Gawler. Light also contains the northern end of the Max Fatchen Expressway.

The council was also spanned by the Morgan railway line (Gawler, Roseworthy, Freeling, Kapunda toward Eudunda) and Peterborough railway line (from the junction at Roseworthy through Wasleys toward Hamley Bridge). Both lines closed in the early 21st century.

Councillors

The Light Regional Council has a directly elected mayor.

See also
Light River
List of parks and gardens in rural South Australia

References

External links
Official site

Local government areas of South Australia